François Antoine Marie Constantin de Méan et de Beaurieux (Saive, 6 July 1756 – 15 January 1831), was Archbishop of Mechelen, Belgium.

He was born as son of François Antoine, Count of Méan de Beaurieux and Elisabeth of Hoensbroeck-Oost, his older brother Peter Karel became Count of Mean after his father's death.

Career 
On 17 September 1785, at the age of 29, he was ordained as a priest in Liège, Belgium. He was appointed Bishop of Liège on 16 August 1792, succeeding his uncle César-Constantin-François de Hoensbroeck as the last Prince-Bishop of that principality. He was ejected in July 1794 by French troops and the Principality was annexed to France the following year.  He was appointed Archbishop of Mechelen on 28 July 1817. He became the first Archbishop of Belgium in 1830.

See also
 Archbishopric of Mechelen-Brussels
 Prince-Bishopric of Liège

Sources
 François Antoine Marie Constantin de Méan et de Beaurieux

1756 births
1831 deaths
People from Blegny
Roman Catholic priests of the Austrian Netherlands
18th-century Roman Catholic bishops in the Holy Roman Empire
19th-century Roman Catholic archbishops in Belgium
Roman Catholic archbishops of Mechelen-Brussels
Prince-Bishops of Liège
People of the Liège Revolution
Liberal Catholicism